The Taifa of Silves was an Arab taifa kingdom that existed in what is now southern Portugal for two distinct periods: from 1027 to 1063, and again from 1145 to 1150, when it was finally conquered by the Almohad Caliphate.

The taifa occupied the westernmost part of the presently Portuguese region of Algarve, near Cape St. Vincent, with its capital in Silves. Starting from 1048, the power was held by the family of the Banu Muzayn, including three emirs: Isa II al-Muzaffar (1048–1053), Muhammad II al-Nasir (1053–1058), and Isa III al-Muzaffar (1058–1063). Under the latter the kingdom was conquered by the more powerful taifa of Seville, led by Abbad II al-Mu'tadid.

During the so-called second taifa period, which followed the fall of the Almoravid dynasty, Silves was the seat of a second, ephemeral taifa, which lasted from 1145 to 1150, when it was conquered by the Almohads.

List of Emirs

Banu Muzayn
'Isa I: 1027–1040/1
Muhammad I: 1040/1–1048
'Isa II: 1048–1053
Muhammad II: 1053–1058
'Isa III: 1058–1063
To Seville: 1063–1091
To Morocco: 1091–1145

al-Mundirid dynasty
Abu'l-Walid Muhammad: 1145–1150
To Morocco: 1150–1250

See also
 List of Sunni Muslim dynasties

References

1151 disestablishments
States and territories established in 1040
Silves
Taifas in Portugal
History of the Algarve
11th century in Portugal
12th century in Portugal